In the theory of C*-algebras, the universal representation of a C*-algebra is a faithful representation which is the direct sum of the GNS representations corresponding to the states of the C*-algebra. The various properties of the universal representation are used to obtain information about the ideals and quotients of the C*-algebra. The close relationship between an arbitrary representation of a C*-algebra and its universal representation can be exploited to obtain several criteria for determining whether a linear functional on the algebra is ultraweakly continuous. The method of using the properties of the universal representation as a tool to prove results about the C*-algebra and its representations is commonly referred to as universal representation techniques in the literature.

Formal definition and properties
Definition. Let A be a C*-algebra with state space S. The representation

on the Hilbert space  is known as the universal representation of A.

As the universal representation is faithful, A is *-isomorphic to the C*-subalgebra Φ(A) of B(HΦ).

States of Φ(A)
With τ a state of A, let πτ denote the corresponding GNS representation on the Hilbert space Hτ. Using the notation defined here, τ is ωx ∘ πτ for a suitable unit vector x(=xτ) in Hτ. Thus τ is ωy ∘ Φ, where y is the unit vector Σρ∈S ⊕yρ in HΦ, defined by yτ=x, yρ=0(ρ≠τ). Since the mapping τ → τ ∘ Φ−1 takes the state space of A onto the state space of Φ(A), it follows that each state of Φ(A) is a vector state.

Bounded functionals of Φ(A)
Let Φ(A)− denote the weak-operator closure of Φ(A) in B(HΦ). Each bounded linear functional ρ on Φ(A) is weak-operator continuous and extends uniquely preserving norm, to a weak-operator continuous linear functional  on the von Neumann algebra Φ(A)−. The mapping ρ →  is an isometric isomorphism from the dual space Φ(A)* onto the predual of  Φ(A)−. As the set of linear functionals determining the weak topologies coincide,  the weak-operator topology on Φ(A)− coincides with the ultraweak topology. Thus the weak-operator and ultraweak topologies on Φ(A) both coincide with the weak topology of Φ(A) obtained from its norm-dual as a Banach space.

Ideals of Φ(A)
If K is a convex subset of Φ(A), the ultraweak closure of K (denoted by K−)coincides with the strong-operator, weak-operator closures of K in B(HΦ). The norm closure of K is Φ(A) ∩ K−. One can give a description of norm-closed left ideals in Φ(A) from the structure theory of ideals for von Neumann algebras, which is relatively much more simple. If K is a norm-closed left ideal in Φ(A), there is a projection E in Φ(A)− such that 
 
If K is a norm-closed two-sided ideal in Φ(A), E lies in the center of Φ(A)−.

Representations of A
If π is a representation of A, there is a projection P in the center of Φ(A)− and a *-isomorphism α from the von Neumann algebra Φ(A)−P onto π(A)− such that π(a) = α(Φ(a)P) for each a in A. This can be conveniently captured in the commutative diagram below :

Here ψ is the map that sends a to aP, α0 denotes the restriction of α to Φ(A)P, ι denotes the inclusion map.

As α is ultraweakly bicontinuous, the same is true of α0. Moreover, ψ is ultraweakly continuous, and is a *-isomorphism if π is a faithful representation.

Ultraweakly continuous, and singular components
Let A be a C*-algebra acting on a Hilbert space H. For ρ in A* and S in Φ(A)−, let Sρ in A* be defined by Sρ(a) = (Φ(a)S) for all a in A. If P is the projection in the above commutative diagram when π:A → B(H) is the inclusion mapping, then ρ in A* is ultraweakly continuous if and only if ρ = Pρ. A functional ρ in A* is said to be singular if Pρ = 0.
Each ρ in A* can be uniquely expressed in the form ρ=ρu+ρs, with ρu ultraweakly continuous and ρs singular. Moreover, ||ρ||=||ρu||+||ρs|| and if ρ is positive, or hermitian, the same is true of ρu, ρs.

Applications

Christensen–Haagerup principle
Let f and g be continuous, real-valued functions on C4m and C4n, respectively, σ1, σ2, ..., σm be ultraweakly continuous, linear functionals on a von Neumann algebra R acting on the Hilbert space H, and ρ1, ρ2, ..., ρn be bounded linear functionals on R such that, for each a in R,

Then the above inequality holds if each ρj is replaced by its ultraweakly continuous component (ρj)u.

References
Kadison, Richard, Fundamentals of the Theory of Operator Algebras, Vol. I : Elementary Theory, American Mathematical Society. .
Kadison, Richard, Fundamentals of the Theory of Operator Algebras, Vol. II : Advanced Theory, American Mathematical Society. .
.

Operator algebras
C*-algebras